The Bowlus BZ-1 is an American single seat FAI 15 Meter Class, V-tailed glider that was designed and built by Michael Bowlus.

Design and development
The BZ-1 started as a design by Clark Frazier of Bluffton, Ohio in 1967. He started construction of a glider fuselage from the drop tank of a North American F-86 Sabre and called it the Zeus II. Frazier never completed the project and it was subsequently purchased by Michael Bowlus of Worthington, Ohio. The wing incorporates ailerons hinged at the bottom and a NACA 65 (3)-618 laminar flow airfoil. The interconnected flaps and ailerons are all undercambered and assembled using the same bonded construction technique used on the Schreder HP-18. The flaps extend to 90° for landing.

The BZ-1 has a retractable monowheel landing gear, a V-tail and was built from aluminium. The BZ-1 had its first flight on September 13, 1984.

The aircraft was reported as complete and ready for first flight in 1983, but in May 2011, it was no longer on the Federal Aviation Administration registry.

Specifications (BZ-1)

See also

References

1980s United States sailplanes
Homebuilt aircraft
Aircraft first flown in 1983
V-tail aircraft